African College of Commerce and Technology (abbreviated ACCT) is a private tertiary educational institution focusing on business, management, entrepreneurship, technical and information communication technology courses located in Kabale District, Uganda. The programs ACCT offers are examined by different examinations bodies in Uganda like the Uganda Business and Technical Examinations Board (UBTEB). The college is both day and boarding and students are of both genders.

History 
African College of Commerce and Technology was established and commissioned as a business education institution under the name African College of Commerce on 14 April 1986. It was registered and recognized by the Ministry of Education in Uganda in June 1986. The college had its first graduation ceremony in 1990.

Timeline 
1990: First graduation ceremony
1992: Introduction of computer science courses
1994: Affiliation to Uganda National Examinations Board, now known as Uganda Business and Technical Examinations Board (UBTEB)
2003: Affiliation to Makerere University Business School
2005: The college receives financial support from Germany to establish a campus including buildings, computers, textbooks and develop a human resource department
2007: ACCT wins the Bronze award Employer Of The Year 2006 by the Federation of Uganda Employers
2008: Accreditation by the Uganda National Council for Higher Education (NCHE) as a recognized institution of higher learning in Uganda
2014: Name change from African College of Commerce to African College of Commerce and Technology
2015: Affiliation to Kyambogo University for the Technical Teacher Training programs
2016:   Cerebrated 30 years and 13th graduation on 15-04-2016
2018:   Accredited by Uganda Business and Technical Examinations Board for the Diploma in Engineering Programmes
2018:  UBTEB harmonizes All ACCT examinations centers No. BTV062
2018:   Accredited by the Directorate of Industrial Training as a center for UVQF  Assessments for levels 1, 2, 3,  Modular assessment and the assessment of Workers PAS
2018:   Cerebrated 32 years and graduated 671 former students on 25 August 2018
2020:   Received support from World Bank through Private Sector Foundation Uganda under the Skills Development Facility to support the training of Internet of Things as a new innovation,  the first of its kind in Uganda
2020:  Graduated 402 students during the 15th Graduation Ceremony on 30 and 31 October 2020

Academic units

Faculty of Business and Management 
The following Programmes are offered at the Faculty of Business and Management:

Faculty of Vocational
The following Programmes are offered in at the Faculty of Vocational at the college:

Faculty of Engineering 
The following Programmes are offered in the Faculty of Engineering at the college:

Faculty of Education 
The college offers a Diploma in Instructor and Technical Teacher Education (DITTE) of Kyambogo University with the following specializations:
Electrical Engineering
Building and Civil Engineering
Tailoring and Garment Design
Agriculture
Automotive Engineering
Lather Turning and Shoe Making

Notable alumni 
 Andrew Taremwa Kamba

References

External link

Universities and colleges in Uganda
Kabale District